Artemis Racing is a professional sailing team founded in 2006 by businessman and sailor Torbjörn Törnqvist, named after Artemis, the ancient Greek goddess.

Timeline

 2007: won the MedCup circuit, then called Breitling Medcup, and the TP52 World Championship.
 2008: entered the RC44 Championship, winning the fleet racing element in 2009 and the World title in 2011.
 2009-2010: competed in the Louis Vuitton Trophy regattas. Held in response to long delays from legal action surrounding the America's Cup, the four regattas were each staged in a different country, and teams raced in supplied IACC yachts.
 2011–2012 America’s Cup World Series: won the Match Racing title in both the Naples & Venice Regattas then won the Match Racing titles in the first two regattas of the three-part 2012-2013 season. 
 2013: On May 9, the first of the two AC72 catamarans the team was testing capsized and turtled, resulting in the death of crewmember and British Olympic gold medalist sailor Andrew "Bart" Simpson. This was the second major accident involving the current AC72, following the capsizing of defending Cup champion Oracle Team USA on October 16, 2012.
 2017: In August 2014, Artemis Racing announced its challenge for the 35th America’s Cup which is scheduled to be raced in Bermuda in June 2017. The team designed and built their boats for the 35th America's Cup challenge, from a converted aircraft hangar in Alameda, California. In the challenger series, Artemis progressed to the Louis Vuitton Cup finals, where they were defeated by Emirates Team New Zealand.

See also
 Artemis Technologies

References

External links
 

America's Cup teams
Sailing teams
Extreme Sailing Series teams